The Philippine peso fuerte (Spanish "Strong Peso" sign: PF) was the first paper currency of the Philippines and the  Spanish East Indies during the later Spanish colonial period. It co-circulated with other Spanish silver and gold coins and was issued by El Banco Español Filipino de Isabel II (currently Bank of the Philippine Islands). The banknotes were convertible to either silver pesos or gold coins at the bank's discretion. The colonial government at the time allowed El Banco Español-Filipino to issue pesos fuertes up to one-fourths of its subscribed capital, or a maximum of PF 100,000, which was subsequently raised to 300,000 in 1855.

El Banco Español-Filipino began issuing peso fuerte notes on May 1, 1852. As of the end of the 19th century its circulating volume of 1,800,000 pesos was small relative to about 40,000,000 silver pesos in circulation. See History of Philippine money. The currency was replaced by the modern peso in 1903.

In the beginning of the 20th century an American Thomasite teacher described the paper currency of the Banco Español-Filipino as "printed on a kind of pink blotting paper which looked as if it would be easy to counterfeit."

Denominations

In 1868, the Spanish Revolution of 1868 overthrew Isabel II and forced her to exile in Paris. Upon hearing the news, the bank decided to rename itself as El Banco Español-Filipino, dropping the "Isabel II" from the name.

In 1877, the colonial government also began issuing peso fuerte-denominated treasury notes

Gallery

See also
Philippine peso

References

External links

Bangko Sentral ng Pilipinas - Philippine Central Bank Website
Philippine Money - Coins and Banknotes

Peso
Modern obsolete currencies
1898 disestablishments
Philippines currency history